Westminster University may refer to:
University of Westminster, London, England
 Westminster University (Westminster, Colorado), whose building is listed on the U.S. NRHP